A Graña is a village and naval station (also submarines), shipyard, and town located some 800 meters by sea from the Naval Station of Ferrol, in north-western Spain.

It  is an integral part of the Naval Military Complex of Ferrol.

Geography 
Altitude: 11 meters
Latitude: 43º 29' N
Longitude: 008º 16' W

The village is located on the Ferrol inlet, close to the naval base. The area is semi-urban. It has a port for small boats and a boat club.

It was the first arsenal on the Ferrol inlet during the middle of the 18th century. On this beach the English landed in August 1800, when the campaigns of Manuel Godoy against the Portuguese took place.

External links
Ferrol-San Cibrao Port Authority 

Province of A Coruña
Port cities and towns on the Spanish Atlantic coast
Populated places established in 1726
1726 establishments in Spain